Union Sportive Saint-Pierre-des-Corps Football is a French association football club founded in 1941. They are based in the town of Saint-Pierre-des-Corps and their home stadium is the Stade Camelinat. As of the 2009–10 season, the club plays in the Promotion d'Honneur de Centre, the eighth tier of French football.

External links
US Saint-Pierre-des-Corps official website 

Football clubs in France
Association football clubs established in 1941
1941 establishments in France
Sport in Indre-et-Loire
Football clubs in Centre-Val de Loire